Robert Dormer (1650–1726), of Lee Grange, Buckinghamshire and Lincoln's Inn Fields, was an English barrister, judge of the court of common pleas from 1706, and politician.

He was a Member (MP) of the Parliament of England for Aylesbury from 22 February 1699 to 1700, for Buckinghamshire in the periods December 1701 – 1702 and 1705 – 11 February 1706 and for Northallerton on 23 November 1702 – 1705.

References

1650 births
1726 deaths
People from Buckinghamshire
English MPs 1698–1700
English MPs 1701–1702
English MPs 1702–1705
English MPs 1705–1707
English barristers
Justices of the Common Pleas
Serjeants-at-law (England)